Palau Track and Field Team was a Palauan association football club which competed in the Palau Soccer League, the top level soccer league in Palau, in the inaugural season in 2004, when they finished third. Due to fragmentary records, it is not known how many other seasons they competed in.

References

Football clubs in Palau